Emmanuel Moire (born 16 June 1979 in Le Mans) is a French singer-songwriter, best known for portraying the role of Louis XIV in the French stage musical Le Roi Soleil.

Moire has released four albums (Là) où je pars (2006), L'Équilibre (2009), Le chemin (2013) and La Rencontre (2015). He sings and plays the piano, with a hundred tunes to his credit.
He participated on TV show Danse avec les Stars, which he won in December 2012.

Career

At 21 years of age, Emmanuel was selected to take part in the 16th meeting of Astaffort, a training course for songwriters and performers. Between 2004 and 2007, he portrayed Louis XIV in the successful musical Le Roi Soleil, whose cast included Christophe Maé and Merwan Rim.

Emmanuel Moire released his first solo album, titled Là où je pars, on 13 November 2006. With British pop influences, the first album paid special attention to the melodies even more than the emotions. The piano, vocals and beautiful guitar segments led the listener to a place where love, sufferings and the small joys of the life all mixed. On his Facebook site, Emmanuel said his first album was "about the universal topics which I wanted to treat in a personal way. The role of an artist, it is to invite people into his universe, to give all that he has in him so that each one finds his own story there." "This album is the fruit of a lot of collaboration. I wanted it to represent me so that people could discover me, musically, there." "It is easy to see that this album is a reunion of those close to me at Astaffort. Those, who for several years, share in the same hopes and dreams: Claire Joseph, Yann Guillon, Benoît Poher, Davide Esposito, Christophe Beucher..."  The first single from the album was "Le Sourire".

His second album, titled L'Équilibre was released in April 2009, and includes songs such as "Adulte et Sexy" and "Sans dire un mot" which were made into music videos. "Sois Tranquille" is a very personal song for the artist. In an interview by Deborah Laurent for 7sur7, the artist said: "The music was already written when my brother passed away. I wanted to speak about my brother, of his uncommon greatness. I lost my brother on 28 January. I just said to myself that it was not necessary for me to speak, because I was going to speak about my suffering. I wanted it to be more positive, a homage, some thing more spiritual. Therefore, I 'lent' my voice to my brother."

Emmanuel Moire represented France at the 2007 Sopot Festival in Poland performing his song "Ça me fait du bien" coming runner-up to eventual winner, the Polish band Feel.

In 2019, Moire participated in the 2019 edition of Destination Eurovision to attempt to represent France at the Eurovision Song Contest 2019 in Tel Aviv, Israel, with the song "La promesse". He placed fourth overall in the final.

Personal life

He and his twin brother Nicolas were born in Le Mans on 16 June 1979.

In early 2008, Emmanuel Moire was hit by a car outside his Paris residence. He received a sprained ankle and three cracked ribs. The accident caused him to miss a performance in Strasbourg and the NRJ Music Awards.

On 12 January 2009, Emmanuel's twin brother Nicolas was run over by a car. Nicolas went into a deep coma and died two weeks later, on 28 January 2009. He was just 29.

Moire came out as gay in the French LGBT magazine Têtu in October 2009. In that interview he said, "I hope to live a normal discreet life. I am at peace with myself."

Philanthropy
Moire is a member of the Les Enfoirés charity ensemble since 2014.

Discography

Albums

Singles

*Did not appear in the official Belgian Ultratop 50 charts, but rather in the bubbling under Ultratip charts.

Other charted songs

Featured in

References

External links
 Emmanuel Moire's official site
 Official site of his first solo album
 Le Roi Soleil's official site

1979 births
Danse avec les stars winners
French-language singers
French pop singers
French gay musicians
French LGBT singers
Gay singers
Living people
People from Le Mans
French twins
21st-century French male singers
20th-century French LGBT people
21st-century French LGBT people